"Gangsta Bitch" is the debut single released from Apache's debut album, Apache Ain't Shit. Produced by Q-Tip of A Tribe Called Quest, "Gangsta Bitch" became Apache's only charting single, making it to No. 67 on the Billboard Hot 100.  It contains a sample of "Love and Happiness" by Monty Alexander, originally made famous by Al Green.

"Gangsta Bitch" later appeared in the 2008 video game, Saints Row 2.

Single track listing
"Gangsta Bitch" (Original Version)- 4:47
"Gangsta Bitch" (Clean Version)- 4:44
"Apache Ain't Shit" (LP Version)- 3:33
"Gangsta Bitch" (Clean Version Edit)- 4:21
"Gangsta Bitch" (Instrumental)- 4:47

Charts

References

1992 songs
1993 debut singles
Gangsta rap songs
Songs written by Q-Tip (musician)
Tommy Boy Records singles
Song recordings produced by Q-Tip (musician)